Orr Street, Queenstown is the main street of Queenstown, Tasmania, Australia.

Constructed and utilised by 1901, it had operating banks and hotels such as the prominent Empire Hotel at its western end. It also had many commercial offices and shops until the decline of the local Mount Lyell copper mine in the 1990s.

The junction at the western end is Driffield Street which links to the Lyell Highway.

The street provides a clear view of Mount Owen that lies above Queenstown to the east.  At its western end was the original railway station, railway yard and railway that was the main connection with the outside world until completion of roads in the 1930s (those being Lyell Highway and the Queenstown to Zeehan highway).

The street view inspired the local camera club in the 1930s to have a scene from the street in its regular competitions. 

Until the bituminization, the street required regular resurfacing.

Many structures remain in the historic streetscape, but are no longer functioning in their original purpose.

The street was named after William Orr (born 1843), who was one of the first major investors in the Mount Lyell Mine.

Gallery

See also
 Main Street, Zeehan

Notes

Queenstown, Tasmania
Roads in Western Tasmania